Patricia Ann Collins (May 7, 1935 – May 31, 1997) was an American hypnotist.

Early life 

Collins was born in Detroit, Michigan, on May 7, 1935.  She spent most of her childhood in orphanages and foster homes.

Career 

Collins mentioned in interviews that hypnosis helped her recover from a nervous breakdown. She later studied the art and came up with a nightclub act in which she would hypnotize volunteers from the audience. She owned a nightclub on the Sunset Strip in Hollywood, where she would perform her act, as well as use hypnosis for therapeutic purposes. She became known as the "Hip Hypnotist". At her zenith, Collins earned $4,000 per week.

In 1966, Collins appeared as herself on The Lucy Show, in an episode titled "Lucy and Pat Collins", on which she hypnotized Lucille Ball's and Gale Gordon's characters, Lucy Carmichael and Mr. Mooney. She also appeared in the film Divorce American Style. Collins was seen on the panel shows What's My Line? and I've Got a Secret and on the game show Hollywood Squares.

Collins resided in Beverly Hills until 1983. She then moved to Reno, Nevada, performing there and in Lake Tahoe through 1992, when she moved to San Bernardino with ill health.

Among the celebrities whom Collins hypnotized were Steve Allen, Jill St. John, and Lloyd Bridges. She counted Robert Wagner and Ed Begley, Sr. as friends.

Collins also released two records; Sleep With Pat Collins! (The Hip Hypnotist) (1963) and Turn On! The Power Of The Mind (1967) featuring her hypnosis routines.

Personal life 

Collins had two daughters, a son, and six grandchildren (at the time of her death).

Death 

Collins died at her home in San Bernardino, California, on May 31, 1997. She had been unwell for several years following a stroke.

References

External links 

American hypnotists
1935 births
1997 deaths
Entertainers from Michigan
People from Detroit